Glomawr is an unincorporated community located in Perry County, Kentucky, United States.

Glomawr is the site of a former coal mine owned by the East Tennessee Coal Co.  A post office was established in 1915, and supposedly named for the old Welsh word for high coal.

References

Unincorporated communities in Perry County, Kentucky
Unincorporated communities in Kentucky
Coal towns in Kentucky